|}

The Old Newton Cup is a flat Handicap horse race in Great Britain open to horses of four-year-old and up. It is run at Haydock over a distance of 1 mile 3 furlongs and 175 yards (2,373 metres), and it is scheduled to take place each year in July.

The race has been won by several top-class horses including Collier Hill, Alkaased, Dangerous Midge and Dylan Mouth.

Winners since 1966

See also
 Horse racing in Great Britain
 List of British flat horse races

References
 Paris-Turf:
Racing Post:

Flat races in Great Britain
Haydock Park Racecourse
Open middle distance horse races